The Aves Ridge is a ridge in the eastern Caribbean Sea. It runs in a north-south direction, approximately 250 km west of the Lesser Antilles Volcanic Arc. It is mostly under water, but it reaches the surface in the north as Aves Island and in the south as La Blanquilla Island. Most geologists believe that the Aves Ridge originated as a volcanic arc which is now extinct, though its width poses a problem; the date of its origin is generally placed in the Cretaceous.

References

Underwater ridges of the Atlantic Ocean
Landforms of the Caribbean Sea
Cretaceous volcanoes
Extinct volcanoes